William M. Steinfeldt (March 22, 1917 – September 4, 2006) was an American engineer and politician from New York.

Life
He was born on March 22, 1917, in Rochester, New York. He graduated B.Sc. in chemical engineering from Purdue University in 1938.

He entered politics as a Republican.

He was a member of the New York State Assembly (134th D.) from 1970 to 1974, sitting in the 178th, 179th and 180th New York State Legislatures.

On April 20, 1982, he was elected to the New York State Senate, to fill the vacancy caused by the appointment of Fred J. Eckert as U.S. Ambassador to Fiji. Steinfeldt was re-elected in November 1982, and remained in the State Senate until 1984, sitting in the  184th and 185th New York State Legislatures. in November 1984, he ran for re-election, but was defeated by Democrat Ralph E. Quattrociocchi.

Steinfeldt died on September 4, 2006.

References

1917 births
2006 deaths
Politicians from Rochester, New York
Republican Party New York (state) state senators
Purdue University College of Engineering alumni
Republican Party members of the New York State Assembly
20th-century American politicians